Thennambadi, or Thennambady is a small village in Tamil Nadu, India located 6 km From Viralimalai.

Thennambadi is one of the village in Viralimalai Taluk in Pudukkottai District in Tamil Nadu State. Thennambadi is 38 km far from its District Main City Pudukkottai.

Sub Villages in Thennambadi

Gounder street, Medukattanpatti, Thappukattanpatti, Kella Sangampatti, Mela sangampatti, Sattikuppampatti, Kalarankattupatti,
Koothakuditti, Kodikalpatti

References 

Villages in Pudukkottai district